Aleksejs Širokovs (born 20 February 1981) is a Latvian professional ice hockey player currently playing for Dresdner Eislöwen of the DEL2. Most of his professional playing career Širokovs spent in Latvian Hockey League's club HK Liepājas Metalurgs, twice becoming Latvia's champion. From 2004 until 2007 Širokovs played in several Russian Superleague and Russian Major League clubs, but played the 2007-08 season in Belarusian Extraliga club Metallurg Zhlobin.

He played in Latvian national ice hockey team during seven World Championships. He also played in Olympics qualifying tournament, as well as three Junior World Championships.

Career statistics

Regular season and playoffs

International

External links
 
 
 
 

1981 births
Amur Khabarovsk players
Dinamo Riga players
Expatriate ice hockey players in Russia
Atlant Moscow Oblast players
Dresdner Eislöwen players
HC Dynamo Moscow players
HC Kometa Brno players
HC Red Ice players
HC Shakhtyor Soligorsk players
Metallurg Novokuznetsk players
HK Liepājas Metalurgs players
HK Neman Grodno players
HK Riga 2000 players
Ice hockey players at the 2010 Winter Olympics
Kapitan Stupino players
Kazzinc-Torpedo players
Latvian ice hockey centres
Living people
Lukko players
Metallurg Zhlobin players
Neftyanik Almetyevsk players
Olympic ice hockey players of Latvia
Prizma Riga players
SG Cortina players
Ice hockey people from Riga
Latvian expatriate sportspeople in Russia
Latvian expatriate sportspeople in Italy
Latvian expatriate sportspeople in Belarus
Latvian expatriate sportspeople in Finland
Latvian expatriate sportspeople in the Czech Republic
Latvian expatriate sportspeople in Kazakhstan
Latvian expatriate sportspeople in Switzerland
Latvian expatriate sportspeople in Germany
Latvian expatriate sportspeople in Estonia
Expatriate ice hockey players in Italy
Expatriate ice hockey players in Belarus
Expatriate ice hockey players in Finland
Expatriate ice hockey players in the Czech Republic
Expatriate ice hockey players in Kazakhstan
Expatriate ice hockey players in Switzerland
Expatriate ice hockey players in Germany
Expatriate ice hockey players in Estonia
Latvian expatriate ice hockey people